Rusik was the first Russian police sniffer cat in Stavropol, a city near the Caspian sea. He made an important contribution in the search for hidden illegal cargoes of Sturgeon fish, an endangered species, and caviar. 

Rusik began his sniffing career when he first appeared at a police checkpoint in 2002. Following his adoption by the staff, Rusik demonstrated his ability to sniff out sturgeon-smugglers' stashes with accuracy. His talent for sniffing out poached fish soon found him taking over the job of the police's canine team member.

Rusik died in the line of duty on 12 July 2003, when he was hit by a mafia-owned car during an inspection. He had apparently found smuggled sturgeon in the same car some time before, according to personnel at the police checkpoint. Some local sources expressed their belief that Rusik was the object of a contract killing, but the truth is still unclear. Rusik was a siamese with only a year's service at the time of his death. He died a few weeks after Barsik, another police cat who was poisoned with a mouse.

See also
 List of individual cats

References

External links
 BBC News The purrfect crime fighter
 BBC News Fishy end for feline sleuth
 ABC News Curiosity kills sniffer cat: Rusik dies in line of duty

Individual cats
2003 animal deaths
Stavropol
Law enforcement animals